Chaudi is a town in the South Goa district of the state of Goa, India, located approximately two kilometres from Canacona.

History 
The town used to be a place of public business and housed a village hall, as each comunidade had its own hall called chavdi or chaudi where important decisions by the village elders would be made. In Canacona, Chaudi has maintained its prominence as the principal town of the taluka.

References

Cities and towns in South Goa district